The conductor Bernard Haitink recorded works, especially symphonies and other orchestral works, with different orchestras. He made recordings for several labels, including Philips Records, EMI Classics, Columbia Records, LSO Live, RCO Live, and CSO Resound. 


Bavarian Radio Symphony Orchestra:
 Ludwig van Beethoven 
 Missa Solemnis (BR-Klassik, 2014)
 Symphony No. 9 (BR Klassik, 2019)
 Johannes Brahms
 Altrhapsodie, Nänie, Gesang Der Parzen and Begräbnisgesang (Orfeo, 1982)
 Anton Bruckner
 Symphony No. 5 (BR-Klassik, 2010)
 Symphony No. 6 (BR-Klassik, 2017)
 Joseph Haydn
 The Seasons (BR-Klassik, 1997)
 The Creation (BR-Klassik, 2013)
 Gustav Mahler
 Symphony No. 3 (BR-Klassik, 2016)
 Symphony No. 4 (BR-Klassik, 2005)
 Symphony No. 9 (BR-Klassik, 2011)
 Wolfgang Amadeus Mozart 
 Die Zauberflote (EMI, 1981)
 Richard Strauss
 Daphne (EMI, 1983)
 Don Quixote (Sony, 2014)
 Richard Wagner
 Tannhauser (EMI, 1985)
 Der Ring des Nibelungen (EMI, 1989-1991)

Berliner Philharmoniker
 Bela Bartok
 Bluebeard's Castle (EMI, 1996)
 Anton Bruckner
 Symphony No. 4 (2014)
 Symphony No. 5 (2011)
 Gustav Mahler
 Symphonies No. 1-7, 9 (Philips, 1987-1996)
 Igor Stravinsky
 Rite of Spring, Firebird, Petrushka, Pulcinella (Philips)

Boston Symphony Orchestra (Principal Guest conductor from 1995-2004) 
 Johannes Brahms 
 Symphony No. 1 and Nanie with the Tanglewood Festival Chorus (Philips, 1994)
 Symphony No. 2 and Tragic Overture (Philips, 1990)
 Symphony No. 3 and Alto Rhapsody, with Jard Van Nes and the Tanglewood Festival Chorus (Philips, 1993)
 Symphony No. 4 and St Anthony Variations (Philips, 1992)
 Piano Concerto No. 2 with Emanuel Ax (Sony, 1997)
 Maurice Ravel
 Daphnis and Chloe, with Tanglewood Festival Chorus (Philips, 1989)
 Ma Mère l'oye, Menuet antique, Rapsodie espagnole, La Valse (Philips, 1995)
 Alborada del Gracioso, Bolero, Le tombeau de Couperin, Valses nobles et sentimentales (Philips, 1996)

Chicago Symphony Orchestra (Principal conductor from 2007-2010). All recordings produced by CSO Resound, the in-house record label for the Chicago Symphony Orchestra. 
 Anton Bruckner 
Symphony No. 7 (2007)
Gustav Mahler
 Symphony No. 1 (2008)
Symphony No. 2 (2009)
 Symphony No. 3 (2007) (2007)
 Symphony No. 6 (2008)
Francis Poulenc 
Gloria  (2007)
Maurice Ravel
Daphnis et Chloe Ballet (complete) (2007)
 Dmitri Shostakovich: 
 Symphony No. 4 (2008)
 Richard Strauss: 
 Ein Heldenleben (with Anton Webern: Im Sommerwind) (2010)

Glyndebourne Festival Opera (Music director from 1978-1988) 
 Wolfgang Amadeus Mozart
 Don Giovanni (EMI, 1984) with the London Philharmonic Orchestra
 Cosi fan Tutte (EMI, 1987) with the London Philharmonic Orchestra
 Le Nozze di Figaro (EMI, 1984) with the London Philharmonic Orchestra
 Giuseppe Verdi
 La Traviata (VHS)

Lamoureux Orchestra

 Wolfgang Amadeus Mozart
 Violin Concerto No. 1 with David Oistahk, violin (Philips, 1963)
 Igor Stravinsky
 Violin Concerto in D with David, Oistrahk, violin (Philips, 1963)

London Philharmonic Orchestra (Chief conductor from 1967-1979) 
 Ludwig van Beethoven
 Symphonies No. 1-9 (Philips, 1976)
 Piano Concertos No. 1–5 and Choral Fantasy, with Alfred Brendel (Philips)
 Triple Concerto with the Beaux Arts Trio (Philips)
Benjamin Britten 
Our Hunting Fathers (Live recording in 1979, released in 2005 on LPO Ltd. label) 
 Antonin Dvorak
 Cello Concerto with Maurice Gendron, cello - (Philips, 1967)
 Rondo in G minor (Philips, 1967)
 Edward Elgar
 Enigma Variations (Live recording in 1986, released in 2005 on LPO Ltd. label) 
Introduction and Allegro for String Quartet and String Orchestra (Live recording in 1984, released in 2005 on LPO Ltd. label)
 Gustav Holst
 The Planets (Philips, 1970)
 Franz Liszt
 Complete Symphonic Poems (Philips, 1968-1971)
 Felix Mendelssohn Bartholdy
 Symphonies No. 1-5, Overtures (Philips)
 Nikolai Rimsky-Korsakov
 Scheherazade with Rodney Friend, violin – (Philips, 1970s)
 Dmitri Shostakovich
 Symphony No. 1 (Decca, 1980)
Symphony No. 2 (Decca, 1981)
Symphony No. 3 (Decca, 1981)
Symphony No. 4 (Decca, 1979)
Symphony No. 7 (Decca, 1979)
Symphony No. 9 (Decca, 1980)
Symphony No. 10 (Decca, 1977) 
 Symphony No. 10 (Live Recording in 1986, released 2009 on LPO Ltd. label)
The Age of Gold Suite (Decca, 1979)
 Richard Strauss
 Don Juan (LPO, 2014)
 Ein Heldenleben (LPO, 2014)
Igor Stravinsky 
Petrushka (1911 version) (1973)
The Firebird Ballet (1973)
The Rite of Spring (1973)
 Ralph Vaughan Williams  recorded on EMI 
 Symphony No. 1 (1989)
Symphony No. 2 (1986) 
Fantasia on a Theme by Thomas Tallis
Symphony No. 3 (1996)
Symphony No. 4 (1996)
Symphony No. 5 (1994) (Live version on LPO LTD label also available) 
Norfolk Rhapsody No. 1
The Lark Ascending
Symphony No. 6 (1997) 
In the Fen Country
On Wenlock Edge
Symphony No. 7 (1984) (Live version on LPO LTD label also available)
Symphony No. 8 (2000)
Symphony No. 9 (2000)
 Various: Glyndebourne Festival Opera: a Gala Evening (Arthaus DVD, 1992)

London Symphony Orchestra: All recordings produced by LSO Live label, the in-house record label for the London Symphony Orchestra. 
 Ludwig van Beethoven: 
 Symphony No. 1 (2006)
Symphony No. 2 (2005)
Symphony No. 3 & Leonore Overture No. 2 (2005)
Symphony No. 4 (2006)
Symphony No. 5 (2006)
Symphony No. 6 & Triple Concerto (2005)
Symphony No. 7 (2005)
Symphony No. 8 (2006)
Symphony No. 9 (2006)
 Johannes Brahms
 Symphony No. 1 & Serenade No. 2 (2003)
Symphony No. 2 & Double Concerto & Tragic Overture (2003)
Symphony No. 3 (2004)
Symphony No. 4 (2004)
 Anton Bruckner: 
 Symphony No. 4 (2011)
Symphony No. 9 (2013)
 Richard Strauss
 Eine Alpensinfonie (2008)

Orchestre National de L'Opera de Monte-Carlo
 Gabriel Faure
 Elegie (Philips, 1969)
 Camille Saint-Saens
 Cello Concerto No.1 with Maurice Gendron cello (Philips, 1969)

Philharmonia Orchestra, London

 Edward Elgar
Pomp and Circumstance March No. 5 (EMI, 1986)
Symphony No. 1 (EMI, 1983)
Symphony No. 2 (EMI, 1984)
William Walton  
 Symphony No. 1 (EMI, 1981)

Radio Filharmonisch Orkest (Chief conductor from 1957-1961) 
 Hector Berlioz 
 La Damnation de Faust (Challenge Records, 1996)
 Anton Bruckner 
 Symphony No. 7 (Challenge Records, 2019–21)
 Wolfgang Amadeus Mozart 
 Die Zauberflote (Myrto, 1958)

Rotterdam Philharmonic Orchestra 
 Gustav Mahler 
 Symphony No. 2 (RPhO 1991)

Royal Concertgebouw Orchestra (Chief conductor from 1961-1988) 
 Bela Bartok
 Concerto for Orchestra (Philips, 1961)
 Dance Suite (Philips, 1961)
 Music For Strings, Percussion, And Celesta (Philips, 1970)
 Violin Concerto No. 2 with Henryk Szeryng (Philips, 1970)
 Rhapsodie Nr. 1 with Henryk Szeryng (Philips, 1970)
 Ludwig van Beethoven
 Symphonies No. 1-9 (Philips, 1988)
 Violin Romance No. 1 and 2 with Arthur Grumiaux (Philips, 1966)
 Violin Concerto with Henryk Szeryng (Philips, 1971)
 Violin Concerto with Herman Krebbers (Philips, 1975)
 Piano Concertos with Claudio Arrau (Philips, 1964-1965)
 Piano Concertos with Murray Perahia (CBS, 1983-1986)
 Georges Bizet
 Symphony in C
 Jeux d'enfants
 Johannes Brahms
 Symphonies No. 1–4 (Philips)
 Double Concerto with Henryk Szeryng and Janos Starker (Philips, 1971)
 Piano Concertos No. 1–2 with Claudio Arrau (Philips)
Piano Concerto No. 1 with Vladimir Ashkenazy (Decca)
 Piano Concerto No. 1 with Emmanuel Ax (RCO Live)
 Violin Concerto with Frank Peter Zimmermann (RCO Live)
 Max Bruch
 Violin Concerto with Itzhak Perlman (EMI, 1983-1984)
 Anton Bruckner - all on Philips Records, unless otherwise noted
 Symphony No. 0 (1966)
Symphony No. 1 (1972)
Symphony No. 2 (1969)
Symphony No. 3 (1963)
Symphony No. 4 (1965)
Symphony No. 5 (1971)
Symphony No. 6 (1970)
Symphony No. 7 (1966), (1979)
Symphony No. 8 (1960), (1981), (RCO Live, 2005)
Symphony No. 9 (1965), (1981)
 Claude Debussy
 Dance for Harp and String Orchestra (1977)
Images for Orchestra (1977)
Jeux (1979)
La Mer (1976)
Marche ecossaise (1976)
Nocturnes (3) (1979)
Prelude a l'apres-midi d'un faune (1976)
rhapsodie for clarinet and orchestra (1976)
 Alphons Diepenbrock
 Elektra, Symphonic Suite (Donemus, 1958)
 Antonin Dvorak
 Symphony Mo. 2 (Philips, 1960)
 Slavonic Dances no. 1,3,7 And 8 (Philips, 1960)
 Symphony No. 8 (Philips, 1963)
 Slavonic Dances No. 2-4-6 (Philips, 1963)
 Zoltan Kodaly
 Hary Janos Orchestral Suite (Philips, 1970)
 Gustav Mahler all on Philips Records, unless otherwise noted
 Symphony No. 1 (1962)
Symphony No. 2 (1968)
Symphony No. 3 (1966)
Symphony No. 4 (1967), (RCO Live, 2006)
Symphony No. 5 (1970)
Symphony No. 6 (1969)
Symphony No. 7 (1969)
Symphony No. 8 (1971)
Symphony No. 9 (1969)
Adagio from Symphony No. 10 (1971)
 Symphonies No. 1–5, 7, 9 (live recordings Kerstmatinee/Christmas Matinee; Philips, 1977-1987)
 Symphony No. 4 (RCO Live SACD, 2006)
Frank Martin (Preludio) 
Cello Concerto (1970)
The Four Elements (1965)
 Felix Mendelssohn Bartholdy
 A Midsummer Night's Dream (Philips)
 Violin Concerto with Arthur Grumiaux (Philips)
 Violin Concerto with Itzhak Perlman (EMI, 1983-1984)
Sergei Prokofiev
Peter and the Wolf (Philips, 1969)
Sergei Rachmaninov 
Piano Concertos Nos. 1-4 with Vladimir Ashkenazy (1986-1987)
 Maurice Ravel
 Alborado del gracioso (1971)
Bolero (1975)
La Valse (1975)
Le Tombeau de Couperin (1975)
Pavane pour une infante defunte (1976)
rhapsodie espagnol (1973)
 Daphnis et Chloé Suites and Ma mère l’oye (remastered Pentatone)
Franz Schubert (Philips)
Rosamunde Incidental Music (1965)
Symphony No. 8 (1975)
Symphony No. 9 
 Robert Schumann (Philips)
 Genoveva Overture (1984)
Manfred Overture (1983)
Symphony No. 1 (1983)
Symphony No. 2 (1984)
Symphony No. 3 (1981)
Symphony No. 4 (1984)
 Dmitri Shostakovich - released on Decca unless otherwise noted. 
 From Jewish Folk Poetry (1983)
Overture on Russian and Kirghiz Folk Themes (1982)
Six Poems of Marina Tsvetaeva (1982)
Symphony No. 5 (1981)
Symphony No. 6 (1983)
Symphony No. 8 (1982)
Symphony No. 11 (1983)
Symphony No. 12 (1982)
Symphony No. 13 (1984)
Symphony No. 14 (1980)
 Symphony No. 15 (RCO Live, 2012).
 Pyotr Ilyich Tchaikovsky (Philips)
 1812 Overture (1972)
Capriccio Italien (1961)
Francesca di Rimini (1972)
Manfred Symphony (1979)
Marche Slave (1972)
Romeo & Juliet Fantasy Overture (1964)
Symphony No. 1 (1979)
Symphony No. 2 (1977)
Symphony No. 3 (1979)
Symphony No. 4 (1978)
Symphony No. 5 (1974)
Symphony No. 6 (1978)
The Storm (1977)
 Peter Schat
Symphony no. 2 (Donemus, 1986)
 Richard Strauss
 Ein Heldenleben (Philips, 1970)
 Also Sprach Zarathustra and Don Juan (Philips, 1973)
 Don Juan (Philips, 1981)
 Don Quichote with Tibor de Machula (Philips, 1979)
 Tod Und Verklärung (Philips, 1981)
 Till Eulenspiegel (Philips, 1981)
 Eine Alpensinfonie (Philips, 1985)
 The Radio Recordings box, published by Radio Netherlands
 Symphony Edition box set of RCO recordings of Beethoven, Brahms, Bruckner, Mahler, Schumann, Tchaikovsky (36 CDs – Decca, 2014)

Staatskapelle Dresden (Chief conductor from 2002-2004) - Most recordings released by Profil (Hanssler Classics) unless otherwise noted. 
 Ludwig van Beethoven
 Fidelio (1990)
Piano Concertos Nos. 1-5 with Andras Schiff (Teldec) 
 Violin Concerto with Frank Peter Zimmermann (2002)
 Johannes Brahms
 Symphony No. 1 (2002)
 Anton Bruckner
 Symphony No. 6 (2003)
Symphony No. 8 (2002)
 Gustav Mahler
 Symphony No. 2 Resurrection (1995)
 Wolfgang Amadeus Mozart
 Requiem Mass (Philips, 1982)
Symphony No. 38 (2002)
 Carl Maria von Weber
 Oberon Overture (Profil)
 Richard Strauss
 Der Rosenkavalier (EMI)

The Royal Opera, Covent Garden (Music director from 1987-2002)
 Benjamin Britten
 Peter Grimes (EMI, 1993)
 Leos Janacek
 Jenufa (Wagner, 2002)
 Giuseppe Verdi
 Don Carlos (EMI, 1997)

Wiener Philharmoniker
 Johannes Brahms: 
 Ein Deutsches Requiem (Philips, 1990)
 Piano Concerto No. 2 with Vladimir Ashkenazy (Decca, 1982)
 Anton Bruckner: 
 Symphony No. 3 (Philips, 1988)
Symphony No. 4 (Philips, 1985)
Symphony No. 5 (Philips, 1988)
Symphony No. 8 (Philips, 1988)
Te Deum (Philips, 1988)
 Symphony No. 7 (last concert DVD 2019)

References

External links 
 List of recordings from Dutch Divas website
 
 
 

Discographies of classical conductors
Discographies of Dutch artists